Sool Joogto is a small village in the Togdheer region of Somaliland. It comes under Buuhoodle District.

See also
Administrative divisions of Somaliland
Regions of Somaliland
Districts of Somaliland
Somalia–Somaliland border

References

 Sool Joogto

Populated places in Togdheer